Mo-nah-se-tah or Mo-nah-see-tah (c. 1850 - 1922), aka Me-o-tzi, was the daughter of the Cheyenne chief Little Rock. Her father was killed on November 28, 1868, in the Battle of Washita River when the camp of Chief Black Kettle, of which Little Rock was a member, was attacked by the 7th U.S. Cavalry under the command of Lieutenant Colonel George Armstrong Custer. Mo-nah-se-tah was among the 53 Cheyenne women and children taken captive by the 7th Cavalry after the battle.

According to Captain Frederick Benteen, chief of scouts Ben Clark, and Cheyenne oral history, Custer cohabited with teenage Mo-nah-se-tah during the winter and early spring of 1868–1869. Mo-nah-se-tah gave birth to a child in January 1869, two months after Washita; Cheyenne oral history alleges that she later bore a second child, fathered by Custer, in late 1869. Custer, however, had apparently become sterile after contracting venereal disease at West Point, leading some historians to believe that the father was really his brother Thomas.

Battle of the Washita

At daybreak on November 27, 1868, the 7th U.S. Cavalry under the command of Lieutenant Colonel George Custer attacked a Cheyenne camp of 51 lodges on the Washita River in Indian Territory (present-day Oklahoma). Custer's troops were able to take control of the village quickly, but it took longer to quell all remaining resistance. Although some women and children were killed, as Custer acknowledged in his report of the battle, some measures were taken to protect noncombatants, with troops directed to take women and children who had been captured to a designated lodge in the village to be held under guard as the battle continued. One of the scouts, Raphael Romero, was sent to assure those women and children who had remained in their lodges during the attack that they would not be harmed. A total of fifty-three women and children were taken captive.

Account by White Cow Bull (Lakota)
In 1938, Joseph White Cow Bull, an Oglala Lakota veteran of the Battle of the Little Bighorn, went with David Humphreys Miller to the Little Bighorn battlefield and recounted to him his recollections of the battle. Among his recollections:

While we were together in this village [on the Little Bighorn River], I spent most of my time with the Shahiyela [Cheyenne] since I knew their tongue and their ways almost as well as my own. In all those years I had never taken a wife, although I had had many women. One woman I wanted was a pretty young Shahiyela named Monahseetah, or Meotxi as I called her. She was in her middle twenties but had never married any man of her tribe. Some of my Shahiyela friends said she was from the southern branch of their tribe, just visiting up north, and they said no Shahiyela could marry her because she had a seven-year-old son born out of wedlock and that tribal law forbade her getting married. They said the boy’s father had been a white soldier chief named Long Hair; he had killed her father, Chief Black Kettle , in a battle in the south [Battle of the Washita] eight winters before, they said, and captured her. He had told her he wanted to make her his second wife, and so he had her. But after a while his first wife, a white woman, found her out and made him let her go.

Miller asked White Cow Bull, "Was this boy still with her here?" and White Cow Bull answered:
Yes, I saw him often around the Shahiyela camp. He was named Yellow Bird and he had light streaks in his hair. He was always with his mother in the daytime, so I would have to wait until night to try to talk to her alone. She knew I wanted to walk with her under a courting blanket and make her my wife. But she would only talk with me through the tepee cover and never came outside.

Notes

References
 Brill, Charles J. (2002). Conquest of the Southern Plains; Uncensored Narrative of the Battle of the Washita and Custer's Southern Campaign. Norman, OK: University of Oklahoma Press. .  Originally published in 1938 (Oklahoma City, OK: Golden Saga Publishers).
 Cozzens, Peter, ed. (2003). Eyewitnesses to the Indian Wars, Volume Three: Conquering the Southern Plains. Mechanicsburg, PA: Stackpole Books. .
 Custer, George Armstrong. (1874). My Life on the Plains: Or Personal Experiences With the Indians. New York: Sheldon and Company. Also available online from Kansas Collection Books.
 Greene, Jerome A. (2004). Washita, The Southern Cheyenne and the U.S. Army. Campaigns and Commanders Series, vol. 3. Norman, OK: University of Oklahoma Press. .
 Hardorff, Richard G., compiler & editor (2006). Washita Memories: Eyewitness Views of Custer's Attack on Black Kettle's Village. Norman, OK: University of Oklahoma Press. .
 Harrison, Peter, Monahsetah - The Life of a Custer Captive London, English Westerners' Society, 2015.
 Hoig, Stan. (1980). The Battle of the Washita: The Sheridan-Custer Indian Campaign of 1867-69. Lincoln, NE: University of Nebraska Press. . Previously published in 1976 (Garden City, NY: Doubleday). .
 Miller, David Humphreys. (1971). "Echoes of the Little Bighorn." American Heritage Magazine 22(4), June 1971. With an epilogue by Robert M. Utley.
 Utley, Robert M. (2001). Cavalier in Buckskin: George Armstrong Custer and the Western Military Frontier, rev. ed. Norman, OK: University of Oklahoma Press. .
 Welch, James with Paul Stekler (2007 [1994]). Killing Custer: The Battle of Little Bighorn and the Fate of the Plains Indians. New York: Norton Paperback (W. W. Norton & Company). .
 Wert, Jeffry D. (1997). Custer: The Controversial Life of George Armstrong Custer. New York: Simon & Schuster. .

Cheyenne people
1850s births
1922 deaths
George Armstrong Custer
19th-century Native American women
20th-century Native American women
20th-century Native Americans